German submarine U-46 was a Type VIIB U-boat of Nazi Germany's Kriegsmarine during World War II. She had a highly successful career during the war.

Design
German Type VIIB submarines were preceded by the shorter Type VIIA submarines. U-46 had a displacement of  when at the surface and  while submerged. She had two shafts and two  propellers.

U-46 was fitted with five  torpedo tubes (four fitted at the bow and one at the stern), fourteen torpedoes, one  SK C/35 naval gun, 220 rounds, and an anti-aircraft gun. The boat had a complement of between forty-four and sixty.

Service history
U-46 was ordered on 21 November 1936 and laid down on 24 February 1937 at Friedrich Krupp Germaniawerft, Kiel, becoming yard number 581. She was launched on 10 September 1938 and commissioned under her first commander, Kapitänleutnant (Kptlt.) Herbert Sohler, on 2 November of that year. Sohler commanded her during her working up with the 7th U-boat Flotilla, she then became a front boat with that flotilla. She set out from Kiel on her first war patrol on 19 August 1939 in the North Sea, returning on 15 September.

Sohler replaced by Endrass
On 13 April 1940 during the battles around Narvik, Norway U-46 was depth charged and severely damaged by British destroyers supporting . Sohler eventually commanded U-46 for six war patrols, but failed to score any successes against enemy shipping. He was removed from command on 21 May 1940 and was replaced by Engelbert Endrass the following day. Endrass had been Günther Prien's First Officer aboard  when they had infiltrated Scapa Flow and sunk the battleship . U-46 was to be his first command.

Initial successes
Endrass left Kiel on 1 June to patrol the North Sea and into the Atlantic. He was immediately successful, on 6 June U-46 scored her first kill, the armed merchant cruiser . Endrass followed this up with the Finnish merchant ship SS Margareta on 9 June. On 11 June he damaged MV Athelprince; the following day he sank SS Barbara Marie and SS Willowbank. His final kill was the Greek SS Elpis on 17 June. U-46 returned to Kiel on 1 July after 31 days at sea, during which five ships had been sunk for 35,347 tons and another for 8,782 tons, had been damaged.

U-46 relocated to Bergen in August. On 3 August she was spotted by the British submarine . Triad surfaced and attacked U-46 with her 102mm gun at 2230 hours. Endrass dived, pursued by Triad but the two submarines subsequently lost contact. U-46 sailed again on 8 August. It was another highly successful patrol. On 16 August she damaged the Dutch ship SS Alcinous and on 20 August torpedoed the Greek vessel . The ship was declared a total loss.
On 27 August U-46 sank the armed merchant cruiser , followed by SS Ville de Hasselt on 31 August, SS Thornlea on 2 September and SS Luimneach, an Irish steamship sailing under a neutral flag, on 4 September.

There are differences in the accounts given by the captains. Endrass claimed that Captain Eric Jones and his crew "lost their heads completely" at the shot across the bows from his U-boat. Jones was an experienced captain. The Luimneach had survived twelve aerial attacks during the Spanish Civil War. The crew of Luimneach abandoned ship and Endrass sank her with gunfire, as he had no torpedoes remaining. Following an inquiry on 4 March 1941, Dönitz concluded that the U-boat acted correctly in sinking an abandoned ship. U-46 returned to Lorient on the French Atlantic coast on 6 September, having sunk five ships for 29,883 tons and damaged another for 6,189 tons.

Convoy interception
Her next patrol from Saint Nazaire (also in France), only lasted seven days but claimed two ships sunk on 26 September, SS Coast Wings and SS Siljan for a combined total of 3,920 tons. U-46 sailed again on 13 October. During this patrol she was involved in wolfpack attacks against the inbound convoys SC 7 and HX 79. She sank SS Beatus, SS Convallaria and SS Gunborg from SC 7 on 18 October and SS Ruperra and SS Janus from HX 79 on 19 October and 20 October respectively. On 25 October U-46 was attacked by three Lockheed Hudsons of No. 233 Squadron RAF, fatally wounding one of the crew. U-46 put into Kiel on 29 October after 17 days at sea, during which she had sunk 22,966 tons of shipping.

Her next patrol took her from Kiel on 12 February 1941	to St. Nazaire where she arrived on 4 March after 21 days at sea, during which she had not attacked any ships. Her next patrol was more successful. On 29 March SS Liguria was sunk, followed by SS Castor on 31 March and SS British Reliance on 2 April. SS Alderpool was damaged on 3 April; U-46 returned to port, having sunk three ships for 17,465 tons and damaged another for 4,313 tons. The next patrol damaged SS Ensis on 8 June and sank SS Phidias on 9 June. The damaged Ensis had rammed her attacker, damaging U-46’s conning tower and periscope, the patrol was aborted. Endrass carried out his last patrol with U-46 from 26 July until 26 August but did not attack any ships.

Withdrawal from active service and scuttling
After Endrass left the boat on 24 September, U-46 was designated as a training boat with the 26th U-boat Flotilla. She came under a number of commanders: Peter-Ottmar Grau, Konstantin von Puttkamer, Kurt Neubert, Ernst von Witzendorff, Franz Saar, Joachim Knecht and Erich Jewinski, and was moved to the 24th U-boat Flotilla in April 1942. She was decommissioned at Neustadt in October 1943.

As the end of the war approached, she was scuttled on 5 May 1945 in Kupfermühlen Bay.

Wolfpacks
U-46 took part in two wolfpacks, namely:
 Rösing (12 – 15 June 1940)
 West (19 May - 6 June 1941)

Summary of raiding history

References

Notes

Citations

Bibliography

External links

1938 ships
German Type VIIB submarines
Ships built in Kiel
U-boats commissioned in 1938
World War II submarines of Germany
Operation Regenbogen (U-boat)
Maritime incidents in May 1945